Sumaysimah (F104) is the fourth and last ship of the s built for the Qatari Emiri Navy.

Development 
Fincantieri showcased for the first time the multi-role air defence corvettes for the Qatari Emiri Navy during DIMDEX 2018. In August 2017, Qatar officially announced for the order of the four ships of the class after signing the contract in June 2016.

They are able to operate high speed boats such as rigid-hulled inflatable boats with the help of lateral cranes and hauling ramps. All four of the Doha class will serve as the backbone of the Qatari Emiri Navy.

Construction and career 
Sumaysimas first steel was cut on 18 September 2018 and laid down on 13 February 2021 at Fincantieri shipyard in Muggiano, Italy. She was launched on 29 March 2022.

References

External links
 Military Factory

Doha-class corvettes